Alonsa Guevara (born 1986) is a Chilean contemporary realist oil painter living and working in New York City. Her paintings are a depiction of imaginary worlds that mix fantastical and believable traits.

Biography 

Alonsa Guevara Aliaga was born in Rancagua, Chile and grew up for 7 years in the Ecuadorean jungle, before moving to the United States in 2011. She began making art at the age of 12. She studied at the Pontifical Catholic University of Chile and for a Masters at the New York Academy of Art, before being awarded their Fellowship in 2015. She lives in New York City, where her work has been featured by publications such as VICE, Business Insider and TimeOut.

Style & themes

Guevara's early works focused on constructions of invented worlds containing characters in the form of female fashion models, represented as crumpled paper, the intricate structures of fruit, representing "desire, fecundity, and fertility", and included homages to other female artists such as Judy Chicago. Her current works juxtapose tropical fruits and mostly female nudes to represent life-cycles, the connection between humankind, nature and spiritual themes.

Exhibitions 
 2018, Anna Zorina Gallery "Espíritu"
 2018, Cheng Xi Center for Contemporary Art, Beijing, China 
 2016, Anna Zorina Gallery "Ceremonies" 
 2016, Fort Works Art "Duets" 
 2015, Mark Miller Gallery
 2015, National Museum of Women in the Arts, Washington, DC 
 2013, Expressiones Cultural Center, New London CT "Fugitivas"

Awards & residencies 
 2015 NYAA Chubb Fellowship 
 Terra Foundation Residency 
 Michele and Timothy Barakett Scholarship 
 Elizabeth Greenshields Foundation Grant 
 Ministry of Education (Chile)

References 

Living people
1986 births
Chilean emigrants to the United States
New York Academy of Art alumni
21st-century American painters
21st-century American women artists
People from Rancagua